Huilong Township is a township of Jiaokou County in southwestern Shanxi province, China, located  southeast of the county seat as the crow flies. , it has ten villages under its administration.

See also 
 List of township-level divisions of Shanxi

References 

Township-level divisions of Shanxi